Kate Annette Wetherill Estate is a national historic district located at Head of the Harbor in Suffolk County, New York.  The district encompasses an estate with three contributing buildings, two contributing sites, and two contributing structures.  The estate house was designed by Stanford White in 1895 in the Colonial Revival style  The main block of the house is two stories with a full attic formed of facade gables corresponding to an octagonal form.  A large -story, gable-roofed service wing projects to the east.  Also on the property is a pump house, rose garden, stone entrance piers with iron gate, carriage barn, and superintendent's cottage.

It was added to the National Register of Historic Places in 1993.

References

Houses on the National Register of Historic Places in New York (state)
Colonial Revival architecture in New York (state)
Carriage houses in the United States
Houses in Suffolk County, New York
Stanford White buildings
Historic districts on the National Register of Historic Places in New York (state)
National Register of Historic Places in Suffolk County, New York